Don Brookes (born 7 June 1951) is a former  Australian rules footballer who played with South Melbourne in the Victorian Football League (VFL).

Notes

External links 

Living people
1951 births
Australian rules footballers from Victoria (Australia)
Sydney Swans players
People educated at Melbourne High School